Michael John Keen (1935–1991) was a Canadian geoscientist. From 1961 to 1977, he was a professor at Dalhousie University in the Department of Geology. He chaired the department for several years. From 1977 to 1991, he was with the Geological Survey of Canada’s Atlantic Geoscience Centre in Dartmouth, Nova Scotia.

Honours
1986, awarded the Logan Medal by the Geological Association of Canada
the Marine Geoscience Division of the Geological Association of Canada annually awards the Michael J. Keen Medal to a scientist who has made a significant contribution to the field of marine or lacustrine geoscience.
Dalhousie University annually awards the Michael J. Keen Memorial Award to a female student in the second year of the earth sciences programme.

Cited publications
Keen, M.J. September 1968. An Introduction to Marine Geology. The Commonwealth and International library, Geophysics Division.
Keen, M.J., and Williams, G.L.(editors), 1990. Geology of the continental margin of eastern Canada. Geological Survey of Canada, Geology of Canada, no. 2 (also Geological Society of America, The Geology of North America, V. I-1) 855p.

References
Canada's Michael J. Keen Medal Awarded to Bill Normark

External links
Michael J. Keen Medal
The Michael J. Keen Memorial Award

1935 births
1991 deaths
Presidents of the Canadian Geophysical Union
20th-century Canadian geologists
Geological Survey of Canada personnel
Academic staff of the Dalhousie University
Logan Medal recipients